The 1970 Austrian 1000km was an endurance race held at the Österreichring, near Zeltweg, Austria on October 11, 1970. It was the tenth and final round of the 1970 World Sportscar Championship season.

John Wyer's factory supported Gulf-Porsche team won again, they had won 7 of 10 races in the season (in addition to this race, Daytona, Brands Hatch, Monza, Targa Florio, Spa, and Watkins Glen) and on top of that, the Porsche Salzburg prototypes won 2 more races (Nürburgring and Le Mans). Jo Siffert and Brian Redman won their third race together with their Porsche 917K; they faced intense opposition from 2 factory teams with revised and improved cars- Jacky Ickx and Peter Schetty in a Ferrari 512M and later in the race, an Alfa Romeo T33/3-71 driven by Andrea De Adamich and Henri Pescarolo. But Porsche also had made revisions to their machines- they brought to the scenic Österreichring new 5-liter engines for 3 of their 917K's. The engine in the Rodriguez/Kinnunen 917K blew up on the 5th lap while Rodriguez was driving; the Ickx/Schetty 512M's electrics failed on the 54th lap, and although the engine in the Siffert/Redman car was running on 11 cylinders and the De Adamich/Pescarolo Alfa Romeo was catching them at 15 seconds a lap, the engine in the Alfa expired; but they finished 2nd on distance already covered and won the 3 liter prototype class.

The 1970 WSC was utterly dominated by Porsche. They had won every race in the season except Sebring; and they would go on to dominate the next season as well. But new rules for 1972 banning engines in prototypes larger than 3 liters made the 917's and 512's (the 512's were only run by Ferrari for this year; they decided to build a 3 liter car, the 312PB for the new regulations) obsolete, and Porsche pulled out of endurance racing and did not return until 1976.

Official results

Disqualified

Did Not Finish

Statistics
Pole position: #22 John Wyer Automotive Engineering Porsche 917K (Pedro Rodriguez/Leo Kinnunen) - 1:40.48 (131.656 mph/211.881 km/h)
Fastest lap: #31 SpA Ferrari SEFAC Ferrari 512M (Jacky Ickx)- 1:40.0 (132.051 mph/212.514 km/h)
Time taken for winning car to cover scheduled distance: 5 hours, 8 minutes and 4.67 seconds
Average Speed: 195.592 km/h (121.535 mph)
Weather conditions: Sunny

References

Austrian 1000
Austria
1000 km Zeltweg